Green Valley, West Virginia may refer to:
Green Valley, Kanawha County, West Virginia, an unincorporated community in Kanawha County
Green Valley, Mercer County, West Virginia, an unincorporated community in Mercer County
Green Valley, Nicholas County, West Virginia, an unincorporated community in Nicholas County